Paprocki (feminine: Paprocka; plural: Paproccy) is a Polish locational surname, which originally meant a person from one of the places called Paproc, Paprotki, Paprotno or Paproty in Poland. paproć is Polish for fern, so Paprocki may also be a topographic name for a resident of a location where many ferns grew. Related surnames include Paprocký (Czech), Paprotski, and Paprotsky.

The surname may refer to:
 Bartosz Paprocki (1543–1614), Polish writer
 Thomas Paprocki (born 1952), American bishop
 Wenceslaus Paprocki (died 1643), Polish bishop

See also

References

Polish-language surnames